Peñarrubia may refer to the following places:

 Peñarrubia, Andalusia, a municipality in Andalusia, Spain
 Peñarrubia, Abra, a municipality in Abra, Philippines
 Peñarrubia, Cantabria, a municipality in Cantabria, Spain